Axe Lake Aerodrome  is located near the Axe Lake oil sands discovery in north-west Saskatchewan, Canada. The aerodrome is located near the border with Alberta, just south of Vande Veen Lake. The nearest highway is Highway 955 to the east. A gravel road connects the airport to the highway.

See also
List of airports in Saskatchewan

References

Registered aerodromes in Saskatchewan